Sobolevo is a rural locality (a village) in Kovarditskoye Rural Settlement, Muromsky District, Vladimir Oblast, Russia. The population was 41 as of 2010.

Geography 
Sobolevo is located 15 km northwest of Murom (the district's administrative centre) by road. Afanasovo is the nearest rural locality.

References 

Rural localities in Muromsky District